Henrik Ødegaard (born February 12, 1988) is a Norwegian ice hockey player who is currently playing for Frisk Asker of the Norwegian GET-ligaen.

After playing professionally in the Norwegian GET-ligaen for Ishockeyklubben Sparta Sarpsborg and Frisk Asker Ishockey, Ødegaard signed with the Chicago Wolves of the American Hockey League on October 1, 2013.

After playing one game for the Wolves, Ødegaard was assigned by the Wolves to their affiliate the Missouri Mavericks of the Central Hockey League on October 10, 2013.

Ødegaard also played seven games for Norway in the 2013 IIHF World Championship.  On January 7, 2014, Ødegaard was named to Norway men's national ice hockey team for the 2014 Winter Olympics  On April 18, 2014, Ødegaard was called back up to the Chicago Wolves of the American Hockey League.

On June 16, 2014 Ødegaard signed with Lørenskog IK of GET-ligaen.

Awards and honours

Career statistics

Regular season and playoffs

International

References

External links

1988 births
Living people
Norwegian ice hockey defencemen
Olympic ice hockey players of Norway
Ice hockey players at the 2014 Winter Olympics
Ice hockey players at the 2018 Winter Olympics
Lørenskog IK players
Chicago Wolves players
Missouri Mavericks players
Sparta Warriors players
Frisk Asker Ishockey players
People from Asker
Norwegian expatriate ice hockey people
Norwegian expatriate sportspeople in the United States
Sportspeople from Viken (county)